Giufà, or Giucà as he is referred to in some areas of the country, is a character of Italian folklore. His antics have been retold and memorized through centuries of oral tradition. Although the anecdotes from his life mainly revolve around the southern Italian and Sicilian lifestyle, his character traits are visible in the folk characters of many Mediterranean cultures. In fact, scholars suggest that the character Giufà developed from stories of Nasrudin, a Turkish folk character. It is believed that during Islamic rule of the island of Sicily, stories of this man (known in Arabic as Juha) were absorbed into the Sicilian oral tradition, transformed to exemplify cultural norms and eventually transmitted throughout southern Italy. Although Giufà is most often recognized as the "village fool", his actions and words usually serve to provide a moral message. It is his peers' reactions, rather than Giufà's outrageous behavior, that are judged at the end of each story.

Literature 
Giufà is one of the names given to Gurdulù, the character of "village idiot" and squire of the knight Agilulfo in Italo Calvino's novel The Nonexistent Knight, set in Carolingian France. Giufà is also the protagonist of one of the tales of The sea color of wine by Leonardo Sciascia. In this story, Giufà goes hunting. Mistaking a cardinal's hair for a bird, he shoots him. After killing him, he takes the body to his mother to cook it. After his mother's scolding, Giufà throws the cardinal's body into his well. The local cops start looking for the cardinal and smell the stench in the well. Since none of them want to go down into the well, Giufà offers to go down himself. Once down, instead of tying the cardinal's body, he ties a ram that he had also thrown into the well.

References

External links 
Mal'uocchiu: ambiguity, evil eye, and the language of distress
Italian Wikipedia page on Giufà

Italian folklore
Culture of Sicily
Humor and wit characters